This is a list of the writings of the American writer August Derleth.

Novels

Sac Prairie Saga
 Place of Hawks (1935)
 Country Growth (1940)
 Wisconsin Earth: A Sac Prairie Sampler (1948)
 Sac Prairie People (1948)
 Wisconsin in Their Bones (1961)
 Country Matters (1996)
 Return to Sac Prairie (1996)
 The Lost Sac Prairie Novels (2000), including The Odyssey of Janna Meade (first published in the Star Weekly magazine December 3, 1949); The Wind in the Cedars (also as Happiness Shall Not Escape) (first published in Redbook Magazine, January 1946), Lamplight for the Dark (first published in Redbook Magazine January 1941); Shane's Girls (also as Happiness is a Gift) (first published in Redbook Magazine 1948)

Solar Pons
 "In Re: Sherlock Holmes" – The Adventures of Solar Pons (UK: The Adventures of Solar Pons) (1945)
 The Memoirs of Solar Pons (1951)
 Three Problems for Solar Pons (1952)
 The Return of Solar Pons (1958)
 The Reminiscences of Solar Pons (1961)
 The Adventure of The Orient Express (short tale, 1964)
 Mr. Fairlie's Final Journey (novel, 1968)
 Terror over London (novel)
 The Casebook of Solar Pons (1965)
 A Praed Street Dossier (1968)
 The Chronicles of Solar Pons (1973)
 The Solar Pons Omnibus (1982)
 The Final Adventures of Solar Pons (1998)

Horror and the Cthulhu Mythos
 Someone in the Dark (1941)
 Something Near (1945)
 Not Long for this World (1948)
 The Survivor and Others (1957) 
 The Mask of Cthulhu (1958)
 Lonesome Places (1962)
 The Trail of Cthulhu (1962)
 Mr. George and Other Odd Persons (1963) as Stephen Grendon
 Colonel Markesan and Less Pleasant People (1966) with Mark Schorer
 The Watchers Out of Time and Others (1974) 
 Dwellers in Darkness (1976)
 In Lovecraft's Shadow (1998)
 Who Shall I Say is Calling & Other Stories S. Deziemianowicz, ed. (2009)
 The Sleepers and Other Wakeful Things (2009)
 August Derleth's Eerie Creatures (2009)
 That Is Not Dead: The Black Magic & Occult Stories by August Derleth (2009)

Science fiction
 Harrigan's File (1975)

Other
 Consider Your Verdict (1937) as Tally Mason

Short fiction

Journals (Sac Prairie Saga)
 Atmosphere of Houses (1939)
 Village Year: A Sac Prairie Journal (1941)
 Village Daybook (1947)
 Walden West (1961)
 Countryman's Journal (1963)
 Wisconsin Country: A Sac Prairie Journal (1965)
 Return to Walden West (1970)

Poems
 Incubus (1934)
 Omega (1934)
 To a Spaceship (1934)
 Man and the Cosmos (1935)
 "Only Deserted" (1937)
 The Shores of Night (1947)
 Providence: Two Gentlemen Meet at Midnight (1948)
 Jacksnipe Over (1971)
 Something Left Behind (1971)

Poetry collections

Essays/articles

Biography
 Still Small Voice (1940) – biography of newspaperwoman and writer Zona Gale
 H.P.L.: A Memoir (1945)
 Some Notes on H. P. Lovecraft (1959)
 Concord Rebel: A Life of Henry D. Thoreau (1962)
 Forest Orphans: Carl Marty and His Animal Friends (1964)
 Emerson, Our Contemporary (1970)

History
 The Wisconsin: River of a Thousand Isles (1942)
 The Milwaukee Road: Its First Hundred Years (1948)
 Saint Ignatius and the Company of Jesus (1956)
 Columbus and the New World (1957)
 Father Marquette and the Great Rivers (1959)
 Wisconsin Murders (1968)

Anthologies

As Stephen Grendon

“With H. P. Lovecraft”

With Marc R. Schorer

Other collaborations
 The Churchyard Yew (1947) as Joseph Sheridan Le Fanu
 The Adventure of the Snitch in Time (1953) with Mack Reynolds
 The Adventure of the Ball of Nostradamus (1955) with Mack Reynolds
 The House in the Oaks (1971) with Robert E. Howard

References 

Bibliographies by writer
Bibliographies of American writers
Horror fiction bibliographies